The New Jersey Department of Community Affairs is a governmental agency of the U.S. state of New Jersey. The department is headed by Commissioner Sheila Oliver, who is also serving as lieutenant governor of New Jersey.

Function

The NJDCA provides "administrative guidance, financial support, and technical assistance to local governments, community development organizations, businesses and individuals to improve the quality of life in New Jersey."

Divisions, programs, and services

Division of Codes and Standards
The DCS establishes and enforces building codes, licensing code officials and training to protect the health and safety of New Jerseyans, in partnership with the state's municipalities.  It includes the Bureau of Housing Inspection. It also oversees the implementation of construction codes, amusement ride inspections, gas installations, boarding house licenses, and the New Home Warranty Program.

Edward Smith is the director of the DCS.

Division of Housing and Community Resources
The DCR provides financial and technical assistance to municipalities, community action agencies, and other non-profit organizations in order to promote community development and economic development within the community. Also, it aids local government agencies and non-profit organizations seeking to improve the quality of life for low-income residents.  Specific programs include energy assistance, community services, and neighborhood programs.  The DH works with municipalities, non-profit organizations, private developers, and the New Jersey Housing Mortgage Financing Agency to promote community development by facilitating homeownership and housing. The DH oversees Section 8 housing assistance programs, which are funded by the United States Department of Housing and Urban Development. Other programs seek to create housing opportunities in viable neighborhoods for low-income households, to fund the development of affordable housing throughout the state, and to expand the capacity of non-profit organizations to develop affordable housing. The DH works together with the U.S. Department of Housing and Urban Development and the Council on Affordable Housing.

Janel Winter is the director of the DHCR.

Division of Fire Safety
The DFS is New Jersey's central fire agency, responsible for training firefighters and developing and enforcing the state fire code.

Richard Mikutsky is the director of the DFS.

Division of Local Government Services
The DLGS works with local governments to ensure their financial integrity and solvency and to ensure that they comply with state regulations.  
Melanie Walter is the director of the DLGS.

Sandy Recovery Division
The SRD manages the majority of the federal funds being used to assist the State in recovering from Superstorm Sandy. These funds come from the Community Development Block Grant (CDBG) Disaster Recovery programs of the U.S. Department of Housing and Urban Development. The division is committed to efficiently and effectively addressing the long-term needs of New Jersey's Sandy-impacted residents and communities through programs designed to help homeowners, tenants, landlords, developers and local governments.

Commissioners
Commissioners of the Department of Community Affairs include:
 Paul Ylvisaker (1967-1970)
 Edmund Hume (1970-1971)
 Lawrence "Pat" Kramer (1971-1974)
 Patricia Sheehan (1974-1978)
 Joseph A. LeFante (1978-1982)
 John Renna (1982-1985)
 Leonard S. Coleman Jr. (1986-1988)
 Anthony M. Villane (1988-1990)
 Randy Primas (1990-1992)
 Stephanie R. Bush (1992-1994)
 Harriet E. Derman (1994-1996)
 Jane Kenny (1996-2001)
 Susan Bass Levin (2002-2007)
 Joseph Doria (2007-2009)
 Laurie Griffa (2010-2012)
 Richard Constable (2012-2015)
 Charles Richman (2015-2018)
 Sheila Oliver (2018–present)

References

External links
New Jersey Department of Community Affairs

Community Affairs